The  Tsori Gilod Synagogue is the only functioning Jewish Orthodox synagogue in Lviv, Ukraine.

History 

The Tsori Gilod Synagogue and the Jakob Glanzer Shul are the only two Jewish synagogues in Lviv to have survived World War II. There were nearly fifty before the Nazi occupation. 

It was built in 1925, the synagogue was designed by Albert Kornblüth in the  Baroque style. The construction was financed by Jewish charity "Tsori Gilod", and was designed to accommodate 384 worshipers.

The building managed to survive the war as the Nazis used it as a horse stable. After 1945, under the Soviet regime, the synagogue was used as a warehouse. In 1989, the building was returned to the Jewish community. It was renovated from 1995 to 1997, and again from 1999 to 2000. In 2004–5, under the initiative of HGSS Friends of Lviv (a charity associated with Hampstead Garden Suburb Synagogue in London), and with substantial funding from the Rohr family of New York and Miami, it underwent a major interior renovation under the direction of architect Aron Ostreicher. At the same time the magnificent artwork on the walls and ceilings was restored. These murals of the synagogue are some of the few surviving synagogue paintings in Ukraine. Unfortunately, due to an unprofessional renovation they have lost a touch of the author's soul and their authentic values.

Gallery

See also
List of synagogues in Ukraine
List of Jewish Communities by country

References

External links 

 Tsori Gilod Synagogue, Lviv
 Friends of Lvov Association, London, UK
 Hampstead Garden Suburb Synagogue in London supports Beis Aharon V'Yisrael Synagogue in Lvov

Orthodox synagogues in Ukraine
Synagogues in Lviv
Synagogues completed in 1925